E. G. Sugavanam (born 13 November 1957) was a member of the 15th Lok Sabha, the lower house of the Parliament of India. He represented the Krishnagiri constituency of Tamil Nadu as a Dravida Munnetra Kazhagam (DMK) party member. He defeated Jayalalithaa in the 1996 State Assembly election in Bargur constituency. He contested and lost the 1989, 1991 and 2001 Tamil Nadu state assembly elections from the same constituency. He won twice during the 2004 and 2009 Indian general elections from the Krishnagiri constituency. He was a member of various committees during the United Progressive Alliance coalition rule from 2004 to 2014.

Early life
Sugavanam was born on 13 November 1957 to T. Govindarajan and Manimekalai in Bargur in Krishnagiri district. He has a Diploma in Pharmacy from K.L.E. Society’s S. Nijalingappa College in Bangalore. He is an agriculturist by profession and developed interest in politics later. He married Amsaveni on 28 October 1992 and the pair have a son and a daughter.

He defeated Jayalalithaa in the 1996 Tamil Nadu State Assembly election in the Bargur constituency. He contested and lost the 1989, 1991 and 2001 Tamil Nadu state assembly elections from Bargur constituency. He won twice during the 2004 and 2009 Indian general elections from the Krishnagiri constituency.

Elections contested and positions held

   1996: Elected to Tamil Nadu Legislative Assembly for the first time
   2004-2009: Elected to Lok Sabha (twelfth) for the first time; Member of standing committee on energy, consultative committee of ministry of heavy industries, Central Silk Board and Energy
   May 2009: Elected to Lok Sabha (fifteenth) for the second time; Member of consultative committee of ministry of Road Transport and Highways, Central Silk Board and Energy

References

Living people
1957 births
India MPs 2004–2009
Dravida Munnetra Kazhagam politicians
India MPs 2009–2014
Lok Sabha members from Tamil Nadu
Tamil Nadu MLAs 1996–2001
People from Krishnagiri district